Víctor Patricio de Landaluze (1828 - 8 June 1889), was a Spanish-born painter active for much of his career in Cuba.

Biography
Born in 1830 in Bilbao, Landaluce received a careful education, which included learning several languages. For a time he resided in Paris. His presence in Cuba was recorded around the year 1850. He is the best-known Cuban practitioner of costumbrismo, depicting Cuba peasants (guajiros), landowners, and slaves. He taught at the Academy of Fine Arts of San Alejandro in Havana, and served as its director.  He opposed Cuban independence, an attitude reflected in his work; nevertheless his paintings provide a valuable view of nineteenth-century Cuban society. His works also depict a somewhat idealized view of plantation life.

His first work consisted in the illustration of the book "The Cubans painted by themselves". In 1862 he founded the satirical and cartoon newspaper Don Junípero and in 1881 he illustrated the work Tipos y Costumbres de la Isla de Cuba. Several of his works, including "Three Kings Day in Havana", are in the Museo Nacional de Bellas Artes de La Habana.

Further reading
 Ades, Dawn. Art in Latin America: The Modern Era, 1820–1980. Exh. cat. London: Hayward Gallery, 1989.
 de Juan, Adelaida. Pintura cubana: Temas y variaciones. 1980.
 Garsd, Marta. "Victor Patricio de Landaluze," in Encyclopedia of Latin American History and Culture. Vol. 3, p. 381.
Ramos, Evelyn Carmen. "A Painter of Cuban Life: Víctor Patricio de Landaluze and Nineteenth-Century Cuban Politics (1850–1889)." PhD dissertation–University of Chicago, 2011.

References

Veerle Poupeye. Caribbean Art.  London; Thames and Hudson; 1998.
 Scholarly articles in English about Víctor Patricio Landaluze both in web and PDF @ the Spanish Old Masters Gallery

19th-century Spanish painters
19th-century Spanish male artists
Spanish male painters
Cuban painters